The Liepāja–Priekule Railway is a  long,  gauge railway built in the 19th century to connect Liepāja (in Western Latvia) and Kaišiadorys (in central Lithuania). Currently, the railway line is closed for traffic.

References 

Railway lines in Latvia
Transport in Liepāja
Railway lines opened in 1871
19th-century establishments in Latvia
5 ft gauge railways in Latvia
1871 establishments in the Russian Empire